Vyacheslav Panfilov (born 24 June 1993 in Kyiv, Ukraine) is a Ukrainian football striker.

Career
Panfilov is a product of the FC Dynamo youth sportive school. His first trainers were Vitaliy Khmelnytskyi and Yevhen Yastrebynskyi.

He spent his career in the Ukrainian First League club FC Dynamo-2 Kyiv. And in July 2014 went on loan for FC Hoverla in the Ukrainian Premier League.

On 8 March 2017 Panfilov joined Lithuanian A Lyga club FK Utenis Utena. He was released by the club on 15 April 2017.

In the summer 2019, Panfilov joined German club FC Mecklenburg Schwerin. He left the club at the end of the year.

References

External links
Profile at Official FFU Site (Ukr)

1993 births
Living people
Footballers from Kyiv
Ukrainian footballers
Association football defenders
FC Dynamo-2 Kyiv players
FC Hoverla Uzhhorod players
NK Veres Rivne players
FK Utenis Utena players
FC Zirka Kropyvnytskyi players
SC Chaika Petropavlivska Borshchahivka players
Ukrainian Premier League players
A Lyga players
Ukrainian expatriate footballers
Ukrainian expatriate sportspeople in Lithuania
Ukrainian expatriate sportspeople in Germany
Expatriate footballers in Lithuania
Expatriate footballers in Germany
Association football forwards